Hamilton railway station or Hamilton station may refer to:

In Australia:
Hamilton railway station, New South Wales in Hamilton, New South Wales, Australia
Hamilton railway station, Victoria in Hamilton, Victoria, Australia

In Canada:
Hamilton GO Centre in Hamilton, Ontario, Canada
LIUNA Station, the former CNR station in Hamilton, Ontario, Canada

In New Zealand:
Hamilton railway station (New Zealand) in Hamilton, New Zealand
Hamilton Central railway station (New Zealand), a now-defunct railway station on the East Coast Main Trunk line which runs through the city of Hamilton in the Waikato region of New Zealand.

In the United Kingdom:
Hamilton Central railway station, in Hamilton, South Lanarkshire, Scotland
Hamilton West railway station, in Hamilton, South Lanarkshire, Scotland
Hamilton railway station (North British Railway), a former station in  Hamilton, South Lanarkshire, Scotland

In the United States:
Hamilton station (NJ Transit), in Hamilton, New Jersey United States
Hamilton Avenue station, River Line Light Rail
Hamilton station (Ohio), a former station in Ohio, United States
Hamilton station (VTA), a light rail station in Campbell, California
Hamilton E. Holmes station, a rapid transit station in Atlanta, Georgia

See also
Hamilton (disambiguation)